Wuzhou or Wu Prefecture was a zhou (prefecture) in imperial China, centering on modern Xuanhua County, Hebei, China. It was created in 851 by the Tang dynasty and was later ceded by Later Jin to the Khitan-ruled Liao dynasty as one of the Sixteen Prefectures.

Geography
The administrative region of Wuzhou in the Tang dynasty is in modern Zhangjiakou, Hebei. It probably includes parts of modern: 
Zhangjiakou
Xuanhua County
Wanquan County

References
 

Former prefectures in Hebei
Sixteen Prefectures
Prefectures of the Tang dynasty
Prefectures of Later Tang
851 establishments
850s establishments
9th-century establishments in China